Harry Griffiths may refer to:
Harry Griffiths (footballer, born 1912) (1912–1981), English football and baseball player
Harry Griffiths (footballer, born 1931) (1931–1978), Welsh footballer and manager
Harry Griffiths (footballer, born 1886) (1886–1933), English footballer
Harry Griffiths (footballer, born 1875) (1875–1950), English footballer
Harry Griffiths (politician) (1866–1935), Australian politician
Harry Griffiths (missionary), Methodist missionary in Australia

See also
Harry Griffith (disambiguation)
Henry Griffiths (disambiguation)